Mary of Jesus of Ágreda , OIC, also known as the Abbess of Ágreda (2 April 160224 May 1665), was a Franciscan abbess and spiritual writer, known especially for her extensive correspondence with King Philip IV of Spain and reports of her bilocation between Spain and its colonies in New Spain. She was a noted mystic of her era.

A member of the Order of the Immaculate Conception, also known as Conceptionists, Mary of Jesus wrote 14 books, including a series of revelations about the life of the Blessed Virgin Mary. Her bilocation activity is said to have occurred between her cloistered monastery in rural Spain and the Jumano Indians of central New Mexico and West Texas, as well as Tucson, and inspired many Franciscan missionaries in the New World. In popular culture since the 17th century, she has been dubbed the Lady in Blue and the Blue Nun, after the color of her order's habit.

Life

Early life
She was born María Coronel y de Arana, the daughter of Francisco Coronel, a converso of Jewish descent   , and Catalina de Arana, in Ágreda, a town located in the Province of Soria. The couple had 11 children, of whom only four survived into adulthood: Francisco, José, María and Jerónima. Maria later described her mother as the more lively of the two, though both were very fervent in their faith. The family had close ties with the Franciscan friars of the Friary of San Julián, which lay on the outskirts of the town. Either the mother would go to the friary with her children for Mass and confession, or the friars would visit the family home. Nonetheless, Mary later recalled that, as a very young child, she felt her parents were very hard on her.

Mary of Jesus' biographer and contemporary, the bishop José Jiménez y Samaniego, was a longtime friend of the Coronel family, and testified that even as a young girl Mary was filled with divine knowledge. From her early years, he wrote, she had ecstasies and visions in which she felt that God was instructing her about the sinfulness of the world, a conviction which would last throughout her life. At the age of four, she was confirmed by Diego de Yepes, a bishop and the biographer and last confessor of Teresa of Avila, who was reportedly impressed with the child's spiritual acumen. It was at this point in her life that she felt a growing warmth in her parents' attitudes toward her.

When Mary of Jesus was twelve, she made the decision to enter a monastery, having decided upon that of the Discalced Carmelite nuns in Tarazona. As her parents prepared to accompany her there, Catalina de Arana had a vision that she was to turn the family home into a monastery in which both she and her daughters were to commit their lives as nuns. While the young María was agreeable to this arrangement, her father refused to go along with it. In this he was supported by his brother, Medel, as well as by their neighbors, who all considered this arrangement a violation of their marriage vows. His resistance lasted for three years, until in 1618, then considered an older man in his early fifties, he (and later his brother) entered the Franciscan Friary of San Antonio in Nalda as a lay brother. Her brothers, who had already become friars, continued their studies toward the Catholic priesthood in Burgos. Mary of Jesus later recalled that this period had been one of severe trial for her spiritual life and had led to a certain sense of vanity.

Monastic life

Catalina and her daughters then converted their family home into the Monastery of the Immaculate Conception, to be a part of the Order of the Immaculate Conception. The choice of this Order was a part of the huge devotion to the Immaculate Conception of Mary which marked Spanish spirituality of that period. They began this endeavor as part of the Discalced—or reformed—branch of the Order. Unfortunately, there were no monasteries of this branch in the region, so three nuns of the original Calced branch were brought from their monastery in Burgos to serve as the abbess of the community and to train them in the life of the Order. Mary of Jesus later judged that this had given a bad start to the enterprise, as these nuns were to teach them a way of life they had neither known nor practiced. Mary of Jesus was 16 when she and her mother and sister took the religious habit of the Order and she was given the religious name by which she is now known. She felt, though, that she had to make up for her years of laxity during the period of contention between her parents and the delay in the foundation of the monastery resulting from it.

As other women soon joined the community, the monastery was rebuilt (and completed in 1633), although when reconstruction began the community's coffers contained 24 reales (approximately 2.5 Spanish dollars at the time), supplemented by a donation of 100 reales from devotees and many other gifts and hours of voluntary labor. Once she had made her religious profession in 1620, Mary of Jesus began to experience a long period of illness and temptations. After her mother's death, Mary of Jesus, then aged 25, was appointed the Superior locum tenens, after which her fellow nuns elected her as their abbess. Though rules required the abbess to be changed every three years, Mary remained effectively in charge of the monastery until her death, except for a three-year sabbatical in her fifties.

Throughout her life, Mary of Jesus was inclined to the "internal prayer" or "quiet prayer". Like her countrywoman Teresa of Avila a generation earlier, these prayerful experiences led to religious ecstasies, including reported accounts of levitation. As this form of prayer was practiced frequently among women, the Inquisition kept a watchful eye on those who advocated the practice.

Written works

María de Ágreda's best known single work is the Mystical City of God (Spanish: Mistica Ciudad de Dios, Vida de la Virgen María), consisting of eight books (six volumes). This related her revelations about the terrestrial and heavenly life, received directly from (dictated by) the Blessed Virgin Mary. The books include information about the relationship of the 'Blessed Virgin' with the Triune God, as well as the doings and Mysteries performed by Jesus as God-Man in flesh and in Spirit. The narrative contains extensive details and covers the New Testament time line. It also relates advice given by the Holy Mother on how to acquire true sanctity.

The Mystical City of God, the biography of Mary, is now frequently studied in college and university programs of Spanish language and culture, for its contribution to Baroque literature. Written in elegant Spanish, it relates both terrestrial and spiritual details, many either not known or not totally accepted at the time. These included the way the earth looks from the space (contained in her unpublished 17th Century "Tratado de rendondez de la Tierra"); the Immaculate Conception of Virgin Mary, the Assumption of Mary, the duties of Michael the Archangel and Gabriel the Archangel; and meticulous detail on the childhood of Jesus. Other details that Mary related concerned Christ's Passion, Resurrection and Ascension.

In addition to her 14 published works, Mary of Jesus also served as the spiritual (and sometimes political) advisor to King Philip IV of Spain, at his request and for more than 22 years. Their surviving correspondence includes over 600 letters.

Mystical bilocation and effect on missionaries
Between 1620 and 1623, Mary of Jesus reported that she was often "transported by the aid of the angels" to settlements of a people called Jumanos. The Jumano Indians of New Spain (what is today Texas and New Mexico) had long been requesting missionaries, possibly hoping for protection from the Apaches. Eventually a mission led by the Franciscan Friar Juan de Salas visited them in 1629.

The abbess reported further but less frequent visits afterwards, all while she physically remained in the monastery at Ágreda. They thus are considered bilocations, an event where a person is, or seems to be, in two places at the same time.
Before sending the friars, Father Alonzo de Benavides, Custodian of New Mexico, asked the natives why they were so eager to be baptized. They said they had been visited by a Lady in Blue who had told them to ask the fathers for help, pointing to a painting of a nun in a blue habit and saying she was dressed like that but was a beautiful young girl. The Jumanos visiting Isleta indicated that the Lady in Blue had visited them in the area now known as the Salinas National Monument, south of modern-day Mountainair, New Mexico, about 65 miles (104.6 km) south of Albuquerque.
At the same time, Fray Esteban de Perea brought Benavides an inquiry from Sor María's confessor in Spain asking whether there was any evidence that she had visited the Jumanos.

As reports of Mary's mystical excursions to the New World proliferated, the Inquisition took notice, although she was not proceeded against with severity, perhaps because of her long written relationship with the Spanish king.

Accounts of Mary's mystical apparitions in the American Southwest, as well as inspiring passages in Mystical City of God, so stirred 17th and 18th century missionaries that they credited her in their own life's work, making her an integral part of the colonial history of the United States.

Death and legacy

Less than ten years after her death, Mary of Jesus was declared Venerable by Pope Clement X, in honor of her "heroic life of virtue". Although the process of beatification was opened in 1673, it has not as yet been completed.

Various misinterpretations of Mary's writings led to the  Mystical City of God being placed on the Church's Index Librorum Prohibitorum in August 1681, due to a faulty French translation published in 1678. The placement on the list of forbidden books proved temporary.

The tradition of the apostle St James and the shrine of El Pilar, reputed to be the first church dedicated to Mary, was given by Our Lady in an apparition to Sister Mary Agreda recorded in The Mystical City of God, and is credited with instigating the rebuilding of the fire-damaged Cathedral Basilica in Zaragoza in the Baroque style in 1681 by Charles II, King of Spain, completed and rededicated in 1686.

Incorruptible body
When Mary of Jesus's casket was opened in 1909, a cursory scientific examination was performed on the 17th century abbess's body. In 1989, a Spanish physician named Andreas Medina participated in another examination of the remains and told investigative journalist Javier Sierra in 1991: "What most surprised me about that case is that when we compared the state of the body, as it was described in the medical report from 1909, with how it appeared in 1989, we realized it had absolutely not deteriorated at all in the last eighty years." Investigators took photographs and other evidence before re-sealing her casket, which remains on display in the monastery church. Some consider that incorruptibility, that is, lack of normal rot and decay after death, further evidence of sanctity.

Sainthood process
The abbess is considered "Venerable". After the 400th anniversary of her birth in 2002, several groups (including The Spanish Mariology Society, The Society of Our Lady of the Most Holy Trinity, The Knights of Columbus, The American Council for the Mystical City of God and The Working Group for the Beatification of Sister Maria de Jesus de Agreda) renewed attempts to move her beatification process forward.

In popular culture
San Angelo, Texas, credits the abbess as a pioneering force behind the establishment of early Texas missions.  Jumano Native Americans reminisce about her role in their survival, and her possible connection to the legend of Texas's state flower, the bluebonnet.

She is featured in a work of fiction, The Lady in Blue ("La Dama Azul"), by Javier Sierra (Atria Books, 2005/07), as well as in the English biography Maria of Agreda: Mystical Lady in Blue (University of New Mexico Press, 2009). She also served as the inspiration for the novel Blue Water Woman by Ken Farmer (Timber Creek Press, 2016), book #7 of The Nations series.

In his memoirs, the 18th-century Italian adventurer Giacomo Casanova describes reading the Mystical City of God during his imprisonment in the Venetian prison I Piombi.

References

Bibliography
 
 Life of Venerable Mary of Ágreda, by James A. Carrico, Emmett J. Culligan, 1962.
 The Visions of Sor Maria de Agreda: Writing Knowledge and Power, by Clark A. Colahan, University of Arizona Press, 1994. 
 Maria of Agreda: Mystical Lady in Blue, by Marilyn H. Fedewa, University of New Mexico Press, 2009. 
 
 Quill and Cross in the Borderlands: Sor María de Ágreda and the Lady in Blue, 1628 to the Present. By Anna M. Nogar. 2018. Notre Dame: University of Notre Dame Press.

External links

 María de Jesús de Ágreda | Official home page of her abbey in Spain (English and Spanish)
 Maria di Ágreda | Official site of Postulation in Rome (Italian)
 Online version of "The Mystical City of God"
 Online unabridged versions of the complete "Mystical City of God" - St. Joseph Publications (English and Spanish)
 Catholic Encyclopedia article
 Abridged and 4-Volume Works of María de Ágreda in archive.org
 A detailed account of Ágreda's (also known as The Blue Nun) appearances in 17th century America
 Maria de Agreda Delegation Visits UNM
 Project Continua: Biography of Mary of Ágreda
 

1602 births
1665 deaths
People from the Province of Soria
Conversos
Conceptionist nuns
Franciscan mystics
Franciscan writers
17th-century Spanish nuns
17th-century Spanish women writers
Miracle workers
Spanish spiritual writers
Burials in the Province of Soria
Venerated Catholics
17th-century venerated Christians
17th-century Christian mystics
Incorrupt saints
Marian visionaries
Angelic visionaries
Spanish Christian mystics
Spanish people of Jewish descent